Carteret Community College is a public community college in Morehead City, North Carolina. It was founded in 1963 and serves residents of Carteret County, North Carolina. Carteret Community College is one of 58 institutions comprising the North Carolina Community College System. The college lies on the shores of the Bogue Sound.

History

References

External links 
 

Two-year colleges in the United States
Education in Carteret County, North Carolina
Universities and colleges accredited by the Southern Association of Colleges and Schools
Buildings and structures in Carteret County, North Carolina
North Carolina Community College System colleges